The Nautilaceae form one of five superfamilies that make up the Nautilida according to Bernard Kummel (1964), and the only one that survived past the Triassic. The Nautilaceae comprise six families: Nautilidae, Paracenoceratidae, Pseudonautilidae, Cymatoceratidae, Hercoglossidae, and Aturiidae. Shimanskiy (1957) separated the Paracenoceratidae and Pseudonautilidae from his near equivalent Nautilina and added them to the Lyroceratina, expanding the equivalent Clydonautilaceae and bringing it into the Jurassic. The Nautilaceae are represented by Nautilus and Allonautilus, genera included in the Nautilidae.

Species in the Nautilaceae are generally smooth and involute with straight to strongly sinuous sutures and a small siphuncle. Some groups have sinuous plications or ribs.

The Nautilaceae began in the Late Triassic with Cenoceras, a globular to discoidal genus derived from the Syringonautilidae and possibly from Syringonautilus.  Cenoceras, the earliest member of the Nautilaceae and Nautilidae, is the only nautiloid known to have crossed the upper Triassic boundary and the only one known from the Lower Jurassic.

All six families of the Nautilaceae, except for the Aturiidae (Aturia), are derived from the Cenoceras complex in the Middle Jurassic or from Eutrephoceras which immediately followed. The Cenozoic Aturia seems sufficiently derived to warrant familial distinction from its source, the Hercoglossidae.

References

Kummel B. 1964. Nautiloidea-Nautilida; Treatise on Invertebrate Paleontology Part K, Teichert & Moore (eds) Geological Society of America and University of Kansas Press.

Nautiloids
Mollusc superfamilies
Extant Late Triassic first appearances